Banksmeadow is a suburb in the Eastern Suburbs of Sydney, in the state of New South Wales, Australia. Banksmeadow is located 11 kilometres south of the Sydney central business district, in the local government area of the Bayside Council. Banksmeadow sits on the northern shore of Botany Bay.

History
Banksmeadow is named in honour of naturalist Sir Joseph Banks, who travelled to Australia with Captain James Cook in 1770. Botany Bay is where they first landed ashore on 29 April 1770, when navigating around Australia on the Endeavour.

During the early 1970s, there was extensive land reclamation in Botany Bay, creating a foreshore beach, the golf course and the large container port facilities of Patricks and Hutchison.

Land use
There is no residential land in Banksmeadow. It is a largely industrial area with commercial and industrial developments associated with nearby Port Botany. This includes a number of oil terminals, the Sydenham-Botany Goods Railway and a large Orica Limited chemical facility.

Kelloggs has a factory in Banksmeadow.

Landmarks
Foreshore Beach (also known as Botany Beach) runs along the shore of Botany Bay. Part of the sandy public beach has been lost in recent years due to the expansion of port facilities by the Sydney Ports Corporation. A rock seawall along a large part of the beach has greatly restricted its use as a public beach. Water quality is poor and the beach is subject to major erosion.  Sydney Ports are constructing two groynes to protect what remains of the beach. The area includes Banksmeadow Park and Botany Golf Club.

Schools
Banksmeadow Public School is located at the corner of Wiggins and Trevelyan Streets, Botany. It was established in 1881.

References

External links
Bayside Council
Banksmeadow Suburb Map

Suburbs of Sydney
Bayside Council